Max Janlet (1903 – 8 December 1976) was a Belgian fencer. He competed at the 1928 and 1932 Summer Olympics.

References

External links
 

1903 births
1976 deaths
Belgian male fencers
Belgian épée fencers
Olympic fencers of Belgium
Fencers at the 1928 Summer Olympics
Fencers at the 1932 Summer Olympics
People from Saint-Gilles, Belgium
Sportspeople from Brussels